George Dennis Marc "Denny" Vaughan (born 27 March 1939) is a retired rear admiral in the United States Navy. He was Chief of the United States Naval Reserve from September 1992 until October 1998. Raised in Coos Bay, Oregon, Vaughan graduated from the United States Naval Academy with a B.S. degree in marine science in 1963.

References

1939 births
Living people
People from Coos Bay, Oregon
United States Naval Academy alumni
Recipients of the Legion of Merit
United States Navy admirals
Recipients of the Navy Distinguished Service Medal
Military personnel from Oregon